The Barter Network is a commercial trading network of companies in the United States founded in 2006 by Bergenske Enterprises, Inc. of which G. Jason Bergenske, President and CEO owns 100% of the corporation's shares. The Barter Network has grown to over 700 companies. These companies trade among each other using a medium of exchange called a trade dollar.

Operation
Upon joining the TBN network, members agree to accept TBN Trade Dollars, instead of USD legal tender, when they sell to another TBN member. The trade dollars are electronically (via telephone or internet) transferred by the seller from the buyer’s trade dollar account. TBN members also agree to sell their goods and services on par with their cash everyday selling price.

History

The Barter Network originally opened its doors in 2006 in Sanford, Florida just outside Orlando. In November 2007 they outgrew their offices and moved to Winter Park, Florida.

Corporate governance
G. Jason Bergenske, Chief Executive Officer

Growth

Their trade volume for 2006 was $786K
Their trade volume for 2007 was $1.06 million in 2007.
Their trade volume for 2008 was $1.8 million, an increase of 58% over $1.06 million in 2007.
Their trade volume for 2009 was $2.7 million
Their trade volume for 2010 was $4.2 million

Media Interests
NEWS ARTICLE: A bartering boom has hit Central Florida as Orlando-area businesses try to survive in today's economy using The Barter Network system.

ON TELEVISION: A bartering boom has hit Central Florida as Orlando-area businesses try to survive in today's economy using The Barter Network system.

Tax implications
In the United States, it is generally not possible to avoid income taxes by bartering one's services. According to the IRS, "The fair market value of goods and services exchanged must be included in the income of both parties." The barter in many cases must be reported on Form 1099-B and Schedule C.

Industry associations
 International Drive Chamber of Commerce.
 Central Florida International Chamber of Commerce
 World Connect Chamber of Commerce

See also 
 List of international trade topics
 Local currency
 Local Exchange Trading System
 Natural economy
 Private currency

References

External links
 The Barter Network
 International Reciprocal Trade Association
 National Association of Trade Exchanges

Banking in the United States
Banking organizations
Organizations based in Florida
Organizations established in 2006
Winter Park, Florida